The Maiden of the Grave is a charcoal drawing triptych by Kristjan Raud, from 1919.

Description 
The painting is a charcoal on paper with overall dimensions  of 77.8 x 248.3 centimeters. It is in the collection of the Art Museum of Estonia, in Tallinn.

Analysis 
The scene shows an elemental struggle for survival during a time of war.

References 

1919 drawings
Estonian art
Collections of the Art Museum of Estonia